Willy Del Jesus Aybar Marquez (born March 9, 1983) is a Dominican former professional baseball infielder. He previously played for the Los Angeles Dodgers, Atlanta Braves and Tampa Bay Rays of Major League Baseball (MLB). He is the older brother of Erick Aybar.

Professional career

Los Angeles Dodgers
On August 31, 2005, Aybar made his MLB debut with the Los Angeles Dodgers. In his short time on the big league roster, Aybar made strides in impressing then-manager Jim Tracy.  In 86 at-bats, Aybar compiled a .326 batting average with 10 runs batted in and 3 stolen bases.

After the 2005 season, Aybar was a candidate to start at third base for the Dodgers in 2006.  However, in the offseason, the Dodgers signed free agent and former batting champion Bill Mueller as their starting third baseman.  After they also signed Ramón Martínez to join Óscar Robles in being the primary backups, Aybar found himself out of a job.  His .216 batting average during spring training did not help his cause either.

On May 12, 2006, Aybar received another opportunity to be the starting third baseman when Mueller was placed on the 15-day disabled list for arthroscopic knee surgery, he was recalled from the Dodgers Triple-A affiliate, the Las Vegas 51s.

Atlanta Braves
On July 28, 2006, he was traded to the Braves along with relief pitcher Danys Báez for infielder Wilson Betemit.

On April 18, 2007, Aybar was suspended indefinitely for unknown reasons. He was first suspended on April 15 for three games for failing to show up for treatments for an injured hand. This was a rare move by the Braves organization, and Aybar's lack of participation caused third baseman Chipper Jones to remark "I didn't even know he was still on the team." It was revealed on April 19 that Aybar, according to his agent, had been struggling with "drinking and drugs." He had not been heard from for some time and failed to report to New York for a meeting with major league officials Friday, April 20, according to the Atlanta Journal-Constitution. It was later revealed that Aybar was seeking help at a drug treatment facility. Aybar was removed from the suspended list on August 4 and was sent to the minor leagues to get in shape for being called up. However, on August 14, he underwent season-ending surgery for a stress fracture in his right hand.

Tampa Bay Rays
On January 17, 2008, Aybar was traded along with Chase Fontaine to the Tampa Bay Rays for Jeff Ridgway. On March 24, 2008, it was announced that he would be the starting third baseman for the 2008 Tampa Bay Rays.  He held this position until Evan Longoria was called up early in the season.  Aybar then took the role of utility player.  He finished the season batting .253 with 10 home runs and 35 RBI in 95 games.  In the field, Aybar started 40 games at third base, 18 at first base, 14 at designated hitter, six at second base, and two at shortstop.

He hit a home run in the seventh and deciding game of the ALCS, a 3–1 Rays victory that sent the franchise to the World Series for the first time.

On February 18, 2009, Aybar signed a two-year, $2.6 million contract with the Rays to avoid arbitration.

On December 3, 2010, Aybar was non-tendered by the Rays, making him a free agent.

Independent leagues
Aybar was selected to play for the Edmonton Capitals in the North American League on February 11, 2011. However, he was released by the Capitals due to the Canadian government not granting him a visa. He later joined the Yuma Scorpions in the same Independent league, which was managed by Jose Canseco.

Delfines de Ciudad del Carmen
In 2012, he signed with the Delfines de Ciudad del Carmen in the Mexican Baseball League.

2009 World Baseball Classic
In the 2009 WBC (World Baseball Classic), the Dominican Republic team faced the Netherlands in the first round. After the game went into extra innings, the Dutch team scored on an error made by Aybar, eliminating the heavily-favored Dominican team.

Personal life
Aybar’s brother, Erick Aybar, played in Major League Baseball (MLB) and currently plays for the Acereros de Monclova of the Mexican League. His nephew, Wander Franco, currently plays for the Tampa Bay Rays.

Legal issues
Aybar has been arrested on multiple occasions for assaulting his wife.  On January 31, 2008, he was arrested on domestic violence charges for assaulting his wife in the Dominican Republic. In 2010, Aybar was convicted and sentenced to three months in prison for assaulting his wife and violating a restraining order. She had suffered serious injuries and spent some time in an ICU while in critical condition.  In June 2011, Aybar was arrested again for allegedly assaulting his wife. According to the police report, Aybar, who has also battled alcohol problems, was found "extremely intoxicated" at the front entrance of the SeaTac Hilton hotel. Police documents stated they went to Aybar's room, where his wife was crying and holding a bloody towel to her face and had a cut lip and an abrasion on her forehead and cheek.

References

External links

Minor League Splits and Situational Stats

1983 births
Living people
Atlanta Braves players
Central American and Caribbean Games bronze medalists for the Dominican Republic
Central American and Caribbean Games medalists in baseball
Competitors at the 2014 Central American and Caribbean Games
Delfines de Ciudad del Carmen players
Dominican Republic expatriate baseball players in Mexico
Dominican Republic expatriate baseball players in the United States
Durham Bulls players
Great Falls Dodgers players
Jacksonville Suns players
Las Vegas 51s players
Leones del Escogido players
Leones de Yucatán players
Los Angeles Dodgers players
Major League Baseball players from the Dominican Republic
Major League Baseball third basemen
Mexican League baseball first basemen
Mexican League baseball second basemen
Mexican League baseball third basemen
People from Baní
Richmond Braves players
Scottsdale Scorpions players
Tampa Bay Rays players
Tigres del Licey players
Vaqueros Laguna players
Vero Beach Devil Rays players
Vero Beach Dodgers players
Wilmington Waves players
World Baseball Classic players of the Dominican Republic
Yuma Scorpions players
2009 World Baseball Classic players